Marianna Historic District may refer to:

Marianna Commercial Historic District, Marianna, Arkansas, listed on the National Register of Historic Places (NRHP) in Lee County, Arkansas
Marianna Historic District (Marianna, Florida), NRHP-listed
Marianna Historic District (Marianna, Pennsylvania), listed on the NRHP in Pennsylvania